Daniel Brown (born December 25, 1945) is a former city councilman and former acting mayor of the city of Knoxville, Tennessee, where he was the first African American to serve as mayor.

Brown was born in Knoxville, where he graduated from Austin High School. He attended Tennessee State University, where he received B.S. degree in history. Brown is a Vietnam War veteran and a retiree of the U.S. Postal Service.

He was selected by the council to serve as mayor after Bill Haslam resigned from office in order to pursue his eventually successful campaign for governor, making Brown the first African American mayor of the city.  He did not run for a full term as mayor, but remained on the city council.  He was succeeded by Madeline Rogero.

References

External links
 
 City Council: Daniel T. Brown - Sixth District, archived 26 October 2012 from City of Knoxville website

Mayors of Knoxville, Tennessee
African-American mayors in Tennessee
African-American people in Tennessee politics
Living people
Tennessee city council members
Tennessee State University alumni
1945 births
21st-century African-American people
20th-century African-American people